Dorantes is a Spanish surname that may refer to:

Marco Antonio Dorantes García, retired Mexican association football referee
Irma Dorantes, Mexican actress, singer, and equestrian
Andrés Dorantes de Carranza, Spanish explorer
Sergio Dorantes, Mexican photojournalist 
Genero Espinosa Dorantes, Mexican criminal
Carmen Dorantes Martínez, Mexican politician 

It may also refer to:
Urbanus dorantes, a New World butterfly of the family Hesperiidae